Drizzona is a former comune (municipality) in the Province of Cremona in the Italian region Lombardy, located about  southeast of Milan and about  east of Cremona. On 1 January 2019 it merged with Piadena to form Piadena Drizzona.

Drizzona bordered the following municipalities: Canneto sull'Oglio, Isola Dovarese, Piadena, Torre de' Picenardi, Voltido.

References

External links
 Official website 

Cities and towns in Lombardy
Populated places disestablished in 2019